The Literary Translators' Association of Canada (LTAC) (or, in French, Association des traducteurs et traductrices littéraires du Canada (ATTLC)) is an association of literary translators from across Canada.

The Literary Translators' Association of Canada is affiliated with the International Federation of Translators (FIT).

History
The Literary Translators' Association of Canada was founded in 1975 and now has approximately 120 members, mainly translating literary works originally written in French or English, although many work in other languages.

Among the LTAC's achievements has been obtaining codified recognition of translations as literary works in the Canadian Copyright Act, and a 50% share of public lending right payments for translators.
 
The Association's activities focus primarily on serving its members and on raising public awareness of quality in translation. To this end the LTAC sponsors the John Glassco Translation Prize, an annual award with a $1000 purse for a first book-length translation into French or English from any language.

See also 
 International Federation of Translators

External links
 LTAC website

Translation associations of Canada